Alois "Al" Paul Hiebert (June 4, 1938 – April 23, 2000) is a former provincial level politician from Alberta, Canada. He served as a member of the Legislative Assembly of Alberta from 1979 to 1986.

Political career
Hiebert ran for a seat to the Alberta Legislature in the 1979 Alberta general election. He won the vacant electoral district of Edmonton-Gold Bar to hold it for the Progressive Conservatives with a landslide. Heibert ran for a second term in office in the 1982 Alberta general election. He won the district with a bigger landslide.

Hiebert ran for a third term in office in the 1986 Alberta general election. He lost a significant portion of his popular vote from 1982 and was easily defeated by Alberta Liberal candidate Bettie Hewes. Hiebert did not return to provincial politics after getting defeated.

References

External links
Legislative Assembly of Alberta Members Listing

1938 births
2000 deaths
People from Humboldt, Saskatchewan
Politicians from Edmonton
Progressive Conservative Association of Alberta MLAs